Bilyne is a village in Odesa Oblast, southern Ukraine located near the Dniester river border with Moldova. It is located at 47° 52' 31"n, 29° 37' 22"e.

References

Shtetls
Villages in Podilsk Raion
Balta Hromada